The Archdiocese of Hartford is a Latin Church ecclesiastical territory or archdiocese of the Catholic Church in Hartford, Litchfield and New Haven counties in the U.S. State of Connecticut. The archdiocese includes about 470,000 Catholics, more than 500 priests, 216 parishes and almost 300 deacons. This is roughly one-half the population of the three counties. The Archdiocese of Hartford is a metropolitan see.

History

History of Catholics in Connecticut
In 1780-1781, the small town of Lebanon, Connecticut, had the distinction of being the place in which the Catholic "Mass was first celebrated, continuously and for a long period, within the limits of the State of Connecticut."  On June 26, 1881, St. Peter's parish, Hartford, celebrated "the centenary of the first Mass in Connecticut."

The present territory of the archdiocese of Hartford was originally part of the Diocese of Boston until Bishop Benedict Joseph Fenwick of Boston expressed concern that there should be separate dioceses for Connecticut and Rhode Island in keeping with the growing Catholic population in those states.

Diocese
On November 28, 1843, the Diocese of Hartford was established by Pope Gregory XVI with Willam Tyler as its first bishop. At the time of its creation, there were 10,000 Catholics in the area. Tyler was able to petition successfully to move the See of Hartford to Providence, Rhode Island, in order to be nearer to the majority of the Catholics. He attended the Seventh Provincial Council of Baltimore which convened 5 May 1849, but weakened by consumption died the following month, having served for 5 years.

The second bishop, Bernard O'Reilly, spent his time securing priests for the still young diocese all the while helping to curb the anti-Catholic movements of the time propagated by the Know Nothing Party. To provide for the education of the young, O'Reilly brought to his diocese the Sisters of Mercy, establishing them in his episcopal city in 1851. In January 1856, O'Reilly was lost at sea on board the steamer Pacific. It wasn't until two years later that the third bishop of the diocese was installed, Francis Patrick McFarland, known as the "Civil War Bishop." Despite ill health, McFarland was able to participate in the First Vatican Council (1869-1870). As a result of his increasingly poor health, Bishop McFarland requested that his diocese be divided to lessen his burden. In 1872, the Diocese of Providence comprising the state of Rhode Island and four counties in Southeastern Massachusetts was established. Bishop McFarland returned the See of Hartford to its original home city, and his territory was reduced to the state of Connecticut and Fisher's Island, NY. 

Thomas Galberry, an Augustinian friar and former president of Villanova College, was installed as the 4th bishop of Hartford in 1877. Galberry only served for two years before an abrupt death but he was able to lay down the cornerstone of the original cathedral. Galberry was followed by Lawrence S. McMahon. McMahon had served as chaplain with the 28th Massachusetts. Under his leadership of 14 years, 48 parishes as well as 16 school parishes were established. The sixth bishop, Michael Tierney, helped with the creation of 5 diocesan hospitals.

John Joseph Nilan became the seventh bishop while John Murray became the first auxiliary bishop of Hartford. Murray would later become the Archbishop of St. Paul.

Archdiocese
In 1945, Henry Joseph O'Brien was installed as the ninth bishop of Hartford. During his tenure, the diocese became an archdiocese under Pope Pius XII in 1953, and thus O'Brien became the first archbishop of Hartford. At this time, the suffragan dioceses of Norwich in the eastern and Bridgeport in the southwestern portions of the state were formed.

On October 31st, 2020, Michael J. McGivney, who founded the Knights of Columbus within the then Diocese of Hartford in 1882 was beatified at a mass celebrated in the Cathedral of St. Joseph. A concurrent ceremony was held at St. Mary's Church in New Haven, CT, where McGivney was assigned as an associate pastor.

Reports of sex abuse

There have been a number of trials concerning child abuse. In February 2005, former Archdiocese of Hartford priest Roman Kramek was deported back to his native country of Poland after serving nine months in prison for sexually assaulting a teenage girl who had sought his spiritual counseling in 2002. In August 2013, Michael Joseph Miller, who previously served at St Paul's church in New Britain, plead guilty to possession of child pornography, publishing an obscenity, and three counts of risk of injury to a minor. He was then sentenced to 5-20 years in prison. 

On January 22, 2019, the Archdiocese of Hartford released a list of 48 clergy who were "credibly accused" of committing acts of sex while serving in the archdiocese. The archdiocese also revealed that $50.6 million was paid to settle more than 140 claims of sexual abuse. In March 2020, a joint settlement of $7.48 million was issued by both the Archdiocese of Hartford and Hopkins School in New Haven for shielding acts of abuse committed by Archdiocese of Hartford teacher Glenn Goncalo when he taught at Hopkins between at least 1990 and 1991. Goncalo committed suicide in 1991 as arraignments were being made for him to surrender to the police.

Coat of arms
The web site of the Archdiocese of Hartford provides the following description of its coat of arms, shown in the information box to the right at the beginning of the article:  "The arms of the Archdiocese of Hartford are called canting arms or armes parlantes, which speak or proclaim the name of the bearer. It displays a hart (deer) crossing a ford (hart+ford = Hartford), and is analogue to the ancient arms of the City of Oxford in England which displays an ox crossing a ford in the same manner. The hart bears a Paschal banner, a symbol of Jesus Christ. The wavy silver and blue lines at the base of the shield are the heraldic convention for water and are an allusion to the Connecticut River which flows through the state."

The web site credits Pierre de Chaignon Larose for the design, introduced during Nilan’s term as the seventh Bishop of Hartford (1910-1934).

Bishops

The following are the lists of ordinaries (bishops of the diocese) and auxiliary bishops, and their terms of service.  They are followed by other priests of this diocese who became bishops.

Bishops of Hartford
 William Tyler (1843–1849)
 Bernard O'Reilly (1849–1856)
 Francis Patrick McFarland (1858–1875)
 Thomas Galberry (1877–1879)
 Lawrence S. McMahon (1879–1893)
 Michael Tierney (1894–1908)
 John J. Nilan (1910–1934)
 Maurice F. McAuliffe (1934–1944)
 Henry J. O'Brien (1945–1953), elevated to Archbishop

Archbishops of Hartford
 Henry J. O'Brien (1953–1969)
 John F. Whealon (1969–1991)
 Daniel Anthony Cronin (1992–2003)
 Henry J. Mansell (2003–2013)
 Leonard P. Blair (2013–present)

Current auxiliary bishop of Hartford
 Juan Miguel Betancourt (2018–present)

Former auxiliary bishops of Hartford
 John Gregory Murray (1920–1925), appointed Bishop of Portland and later Archbishop of Saint Paul
 Maurice F. McAuliffe (1925–1934), appointed Bishop of Hartford
 Henry Joseph O'Brien (1940–1945), appointed Bishop and later Archbishop of Hartford
 John Francis Hackett (1953–1986)
 Joseph Francis Donnelly (1965–1977)
 Peter A. Rosazza (1978–2010)
 Paul S. Loverde (1988–1993), appointed Bishop of Ogdensburg and later Bishop of Arlington
 Christie Macaluso (1997–2017)

Other priests of this diocese who became bishops
 Thomas Francis Hendricken, appointed Bishop of Providence in 1872
 Bonaventure Broderick,  appointed Auxiliary bishop of San Cristóbal de la Habana in Cuba in 1903
 Thomas Joseph Shahan, appointed Rector of The Catholic University of America, and in 1914 Auxiliary Bishop of Baltimore
 Francis Joseph Tief, appointed Bishop of Concordia in 1920
 Joseph Edward McCarthy, appointed Bishop of Portland in Maine in 1932
 Francis Patrick Keough, appointed Bishop of Providence in 1934 and later Archbishop of Baltimore
 Matthew Francis Brady, appointed Bishop of Burlington in 1938 and later Bishop of Manchester
 Patrick Joseph McCormick, appointed Rector of The Catholic University of America twice and later, in 1950, Auxiliary Bishop of Washington
 Vincent Joseph Hines, appointed Bishop of the Roman Catholic Diocese of Norwich in 1959
 Peter Leo Gerety, appointed Coadjutor of Portland in 1966 and subsequently succeeded to that see, and later Archbishop of Newark

Parishes

Due to ongoing pastoral planning within the archdiocese, many parish churches have been consolidated and now share a pastor and other clergy and administrative staff. In this list, individual church buildings that are open for worship will be listed, in the first column, with a wikilink to an article about the church where available. The second column lists the name of the parish (if different from the name of the church), along with a link to the parish website if available.

Former Churches

Archives
Despite disagreement with the majority of genealogists, this particular archdiocese holds firm in their belief that none of their records will be made public for genealogical research. This is a particular hindrance to those wishing to study records of Acadians who were deported to this area in the 1700's, as well as tracing French Canadian families who worked in industrial mills, as they frequently moved throughout various portions of New England and New York. According to the official policy of the Archdiocese, "Sacramental Records are  he property of the Church and are not public records in the sense that they are not open to immediate examination and inspection by  anyone for whatever reason."  They further state, in regards to the only written requests, the only way to request of genealogical records, "Fulfillment of requests is a courtesy, if and when time permits. Restrictions and additional fees may apply.  Results are not guaranteed."

This is in contrast to the policy of a nearby Archdiocese, the Archdiocese of Boston, who has partnered with American Ancestors to make their records publicly accessible

Schools

 High schools
 Academy of Our Lady of Mercy, Lauralton Hall, Milford
 Canterbury School, New Milford
 East Catholic High School, Manchester
 Holy Cross High School, Waterbury
 Northwest Catholic High School, West Hartford
 Notre Dame High School, West Haven
 Sacred Heart Academy, Hamden
 St. Paul Catholic High School, Bristol

Seminaries
St. Thomas Seminary, Bloomfield

Media
The Catholic Transcript magazine
WJMJ radio

Province of Hartford

See: List of the Catholic bishops of the United States#Province of Hartford

See also

 Catholic Church in the United States
 Ecclesiastical Province of Hartford
 Global organisation of the Catholic Church
 List of Roman Catholic archdioceses (by country and continent)
 List of Roman Catholic dioceses (alphabetical) (including archdioceses)
 List of Roman Catholic dioceses (structured view) (including archdioceses)
 List of the Catholic dioceses of the United States

References

External links
Roman Catholic Archdiocese of Hartford Official Site

 
Catholic Church in Connecticut
Hartford
Hartford
Hartford
1843 establishments in Connecticut